Pennellville may refer to: 
Pennellville, New York
Pennellville Historic District - Brunswick, Maine